A big tent party, or catch-all party, is a term used in reference to a political party's policy of permitting or encouraging a broad spectrum of views among its members. This is in contrast to other kinds of parties, which defend a determined ideology, seek voters who adhere to that ideology, and attempt to convince people towards it.

Examples

Armenia

Following the 2018 Armenian parliamentary election, the My Step Alliance rose to power on an anti-corruption and pro-democracy platform. The alliance has been described as maintaining a big tent ideology, as the alliance did not support any one particular political position. Instead, it focused on strengthening Armenia's civil society and economic development.

Australia

The Liberal Party of Australia and its predecessors originated as an alliance of liberals and conservatives in opposition to the Australian Labor Party, beginning with the Commonwealth Liberal Party in 1909. This ideological distinction has endured to the present day, with the modern Liberal Party frequently described as a "broad church", a term popularised by former leader and Prime Minister John Howard. In this context, "broad church" is largely synonymous with "big tent". In the 21st century, the party is often characterised as having a "small-l liberal" wing and a conservative wing, which frequently come into conflict with each other. The party has historically found strong support primarily from the middle-class, though it has in recent decades appealed to socially conservative working-class voters.

Argentina
From its foundation the Justicialist Party has been a Peronist catch-all party, which focuses on the figure of Juan Perón and his wife Eva.

Juntos por el Cambio is an Argentine big tent political coalition. It was created in 2015 as Cambiemos. It is composed of Republican Proposal (centre-right), Civic Coalition ARI (centre) and Radical Civic Union (centre).

Bangladesh 

In Bangladesh Awami League's Grand Alliance (Bangladesh) and BNP's 20 Party Alliance forms coalition with a wide range of parties, thus being catch all parties.

Brazil 

In Brazil, the Centrão is a term for a large bloc political parties that do not have a specific or consistent ideological orientation and aim at ensuring proximity to the executive branch in order to guarantee advantages and allow them to distribute privileges through clientelistic networks. The Brazilian Democratic Movement (MDB) is one of the oldest and most notable "Centrão" and Big Tent party in Brazil, despite begin Brazil's largest party, both in number of members and elected officials, it has never elected a President, only using their position as the largest party as a "bargaining chip" for privileges and advantages. MDB was founded on 1965 at the start of the Brazilian military dictatorship as part of an enforced two-party system by the dictatorship where the only allowed parties were either National Renewal Alliance Party (ARENA), a catch-all party representing the interests of the dictatorship, and MDB, formed to represent a wide-range moderate and less radical opposition to the dictatorship, without a clear program except the democratization of the country. Other Big Tent centrão parties include the Republicans (REP), Progressists (PP), Liberal Party (PL), Brazilian Labour Party (PTB), We Can (PODE), Brazil Union (UB), Social Democratic Party (PSD), Social Christian Party (PSC), Act (AGIR), Patriot (PATRI), Forward (AVANTE), Solidarity (SD) and Republican Party of the Social Order (PROS).

Canada

At the federal level, Canada has been dominated by two big tent parties practicing "brokerage politics." Both the Liberal Party of Canada and the Conservative Party of Canada (and its predecessors) have attracted support from a broad spectrum of voters. Although parties such as the Quebec nationalist Bloc Québécois have elected members to the House of Commons, far-right and far-left parties have never gained a prominent force in Canadian society and have never formed a government in the Canadian Parliament.

Finland
The centre-right National Coalition Party has been described as catch-all party supporting the interests of the urban middle classes.

France
The Renaissance party (formerly La République En Marche!) founded by President Emmanuel Macron has been described as a centrist party with a catch-all nature.

Germany
Both the Christian Democratic Union of Germany/Christian Social Union in Bavaria (CDU/CSU) and the Social Democratic Party of Germany (SPD) are considered big tent or catch-all parties, known in German as Volksparteien ("people's parties").

India
The Indian National Congress attracted support from Indians of all classes, castes and religions opposed to the British Empire.The Janata Party which came into power in India in 1977, was a catch-all party that consisted of people with different ideologies opposed to The Emergency.

Ireland
Fine Gael and Fianna Fáil are considered catch-all parties and are supported by people from different social classes and political ideologies. Both parties are, however, usually described as being very similar and are positioned on the centre-right with a liberal-conservative ideology. The reasons for their remaining separate are mainly from historical factors, with those who supported the Anglo-Irish Treaty in the 1920s eventually becoming Fine Gael and those opposed to the treaty joining Fianna Fáil to seek an independent Ireland.

Italy
In Italy, the Five Star Movement, led by the comedian and actor Beppe Grillo, has been described as a catch-all protest party and "post-ideological big tent" because its supporters do not share similar policy preferences, are split on major economic and social issues and are united largely based on "anti-establishment" sentiments. The Five Star Movement's "successful campaign formula combined anti-establishment sentiments with an economic and political protest which extends beyond the boundaries of traditional political orientations", but its "'catch-all' formula" has limited its ability to become "a mature, functional, effective and coherent contender for government". The Northern League attracted voters in its early years from all of the political spectrum. Forza Italia, on the centre-right, and the Democratic Party, on the centre-left, are considered to be catch-all parties and were mergers of political parties with numerous ideological backgrounds.

Japan 

Historically, the Liberal Democratic Party (LDP) had been formed as a big-tent party uniting groups ranging from Keynesian centrists to nationalist neoliberals. The party developed an intricate factional system to maintain co-operation and to ensure hegemonic success in elections. However, the party has seen some former factions defect or die out since the 1990s, especially the more moderate ones, which has led the party to shift overall towards the right.

The New Frontier Party, which existed from 1994 to 1997, was considered a big political party because it was created to oppose the LDP by people of various ideologies, including social democrats, liberals, neoliberals, Buddhist democrats, and conservatives.

The former main centre-left opposition, the Democratic Party of Japan (DPJ), was Japan’s version of third way politics and served since the mid-1990s as a ‘big tent party’ for a plethora of heterogeneous groups ranging from two socialist parties to liberal and conservative groups.

Mexico
The Institutional Revolutionary Party (PRI) held power in Mexico for 71 uninterrupted years, from 1929 to 2000. It was founded after the Mexican Revolution by Mexican President Plutarco Elías Calles. Then known as the National Revolutionary Party, it was founded in 1929 with the intent of providing a political space to allow all surviving leaders and combatants of the Mexican Revolution to participate and for the resolution the grave political crisis that had been caused by the assassination of President-elect Álvaro Obregón in 1928. Throughout its nine-decade existence, the PRI has adopted a very wide array of ideologies, which are often determined by the President of the Republic in turn. The party nationalized the petroleum industry in 1938 and the banking industry in 1982 In the 1980s, the party went through reforms that shaped its current incarnation, with policies characterized as centre-right, such as the privatization of state-run companies, closer relations with the Catholic Church, and embracing free-market capitalism and neoliberal policies.

The National Regeneration Movement, founded by, Andrés Manuel López Obrador, has often been described as a big-tent party because of its various constituents, which joined its ranks during the 2018 Mexican general elections. The party-led Juntos Hacemos Historia is a big-tent alliance that contested the 2021 Mexican legislative election.

Portugal
The centre-left Socialist Party (PS) and centre-right Social Democratic Party (PSD) have been described as catch-all parties.

Romania
The centre-right Save Romania Union PLUS (USR PLUS) is considered a big-tent or catch-all party.

Spain
Citizens (Spanish: Ciudadanos) has been considered as an example of astroturfing in the  Spanish media since 2015. Originally founded as a social-democratic regional party opposed to Catalan nationalism, the party switched to a catch-all message to attract votes from the right to the moderate left in the party's appearance in the national political landscape. Its stance includes a mix of liberalism and pro-Europeanism, but the party has also embraced populist views on the legitimacy of its political opponents; conservative views on topics such as the criminal system and personal property and Spanish nationalist positions; and many problems by its own leader, Inés Arrimadas. It has become one of the most recognisable catch-all parties in the history of the country. In the mid-2010s, however, the party's main ideology is perceived to have drifted towards the right, with Albert Rivera admitting that it would not agree to form a coalition with the two main centre-left and left parties after the April 2019 Spanish general election, regardless of the results. Furthermore, some commentators argue that Ciudadanos was attempting to supplant the People's Party, which suffered massive losses as the hegemonic party of the right and thus contributed to the shift in Ciudadanos to the right. Similarly, Ciudadanos has allied with both the conservative People's Party and the far-right Vox to achieve coalitions in regional parliaments. That has given rise to the expression "the three rights" to describe the grouping, which defines its opposition as "the left".

South Africa 
The African National Congress (ANC) has been the governing party of South Africa since the country's first democratic election, in 1994, and it has been described by the media as a "big tent" party.  An important aspect of its electoral success has been its ability to include a diverse range of political groups most notably in the form of the Tripartite Alliance between the ANC; the South African Communist Party; and the country's largest trade union, COSATU. Additional interest groups in the party are members of the business community and traditional leaders.

United Kingdom
When Gordon Brown became the Prime Minister of the United Kingdom in 2007, he invited several members from outside the Labour Party into his government. They included former CBI Director-General Digby Jones who became a Minister of State and former Liberal Democrats leader Paddy Ashdown who was offered the position of Northern Ireland Secretary (Ashdown turned down the offer). The media often referred to Brown's ministry as "a government of all the talents" or simply "Brown's big tent".

In Scotland, the Scottish National Party is possibly the longest-established big-tent party in the UK, with the goal of seeking Scottish independence by those that support various other political ideologies and from various political positions. Since 2007, the SNP have been the largest single party in the Scottish Parliament and has formed the Scottish government continuously since the 2007 Scottish general election.

All for Unity is a big tent anti-SNP electoral alliance that contested the 2021 Scottish Parliament election but failed to win any seats.

United States
The Democratic Party, during the New Deal coalition, which was formed to support President Franklin D. Roosevelt's New Deal policies from 1930s to the 1960s, was a "big-tent" party. The coalition brought together labor unions, working-class voters, farm organizations, liberals, Southern Democrats, African Americans, urban voters, and immigrants.

The Blue Dog Coalition is a big-tent caucus of centrist and conservative Democrats in the House of Representatives, some of whom are socially conservative and fiscally and economically progressive or vice versa.  For a brief period after the 2006 and the 2008 elections, when Democrats held a majority in the House, the Coalition wielded increased influence over the party, but its power declined again after most of its members were defeated or retired in the 2010 elections.  Its Republican counterpart is the Republican Main Street Partnership.

To counter the New Deal coalition, the Republican Party was for much of its history a "big tent" party that encompassed a wide range of right-wing and center-right causes, including a wide range of politicians who were fiscally conservative and socially moderate or liberal and vice versa. During the 1970s and the 1980s, the Republicans attracted support from wealthy suburban voters in the South and Midwest, Northeastern moderates, Western libertarians, and rural conservatives across the country. From 1968 to 1988, Republicans won five out of six presidential elections, with the only exception being a narrow loss to the Democrat Jimmy Carter in 1976. The culture wars of the 1990s and the growing influence of the Christian right within the party have prompted the socially moderate and liberal sections of the Republican base, particularly in the Northeast and the Midwest, to begin slowly leaving the party in favor of moderate Democrats or independents.

After the 1974 Dallas Accord, the Libertarian Party embraced the big-tent idea to the extent it ensured that the anarcho-capitalist views would not be excluded from the majority minarchist party.

Other examples

 ANO 2011, Czechia
 Austrian People's Party
 Brazilian Democratic Movement, Brazil
 Christian Democracy, Italy (1943–1994)
 Christian Democratic Union of Germany
 Civic Platform, Poland
 Democratic Party of Socialists of Montenegro
 Fianna Fáil, Republic of Ireland
 Five Star Movement, Italy
 Georgian Dream
 Indian National Congress
 Institutional Revolutionary Party, Mexico
 Islamic Iran Participation Front
 Joint List, Israel
 Labour Party, Lithuania
 La République En Marche!, France
 Liberal Democratic Party, Japan
 National Coalition Party, Finland
 National Liberation Front, Algeria
 National Regeneration Movement, Mexico
 People's Front for Democracy and Justice, Eritrea
 Progressive Conservative Party of Canada
 Republican Party of Armenia, Armenia
 Scottish National Party, Scotland
 Serbian Progressive Party
 Social Democratic Party, Portugal
 Social Democratic Party of Germany
 Socialist Party, Portugal
 South Tyrolean People's Party
 Together for Yes, Ireland
 Together for Yes, Spain
 United Russia, Russia

See also 
 Bipartisanship
 Broad church
 Elite party
 Party of power
 Popular Front
 Syncretic politics
 United Front

Notes

References

Political parties
Political science terminology
Political terminology
Political spectrum
Political ideologies
Political party systems